Hisaki, also known as the Spectroscopic Planet Observatory for Recognition of Interaction of Atmosphere (SPRINT-A) is a Japanese ultraviolet astronomy satellite operated by the Japan Aerospace Exploration Agency (JAXA). The first mission of the Small Scientific Satellite program, it was launched in September 2013 on the maiden flight of the Epsilon rocket. It remains operational as of 2022 and is used to for extreme ultraviolet observations of the Solar System planets.

Launch and naming
Hisaki was launched with an Epsilon rocket, which was its first flight. The four-stage Epsilon rocket flew from the Mu rocket launch complex at the Uchinoura Space Center. The launch occurred at 05:00 UTC on 14 September 2013, following a scrubbed launch attempt on 27 August 2013. Following its successful insertion into orbit and deployment of its solar arrays, the satellite was renamed Hisaki, having been designated SPRINT-A until that point.

Hisaki was named after a cape  used by local fishermen to pray for safe travels in the eastern part of Kimotsuki, Kagoshima near the Uchinoura Space Center, but has the additional meaning of "beyond the Sun".  An old name for the mission was EXCEED (Extreme Ultraviolet Spectroscope for Exospheric Dynamics).

Observations
Hisaki carries an extreme ultraviolet spectrometer, which is used to study the composition of
the atmospheres and the behavior of the magnetospheres of the planets of the Solar System.

In October 2020 it performed joint observation with the BepiColombo probe which performed a flyby of Venus en route to Mercury.

Hisaki remains operational as of 2022,  and e.g. is performing joint observations with Juno orbiter.

References

Spacecraft launched in 2013
2013 in Japan
Satellites of Japan
Extreme ultraviolet telescopes
Satellites orbiting Earth